Godfrey Tenoff (born 1 March 1978 in Pietermaritzburg) is a South African soccer player, currently without a club.

Career

College
Tenoff came to the United States from his native South Africa in 1995. He attended the University of Dayton, playing on the men's soccer team from 1996 to 1999, where he twice earned all conference honors and graduated with a degree in sports medicine.

Professional
Tenoff began his professional career with Indiana Blast, and spent a short period on loan with Maritzburg United back home in South Africa, before moving on to Minnesota Thunder in 2004. He spent four seasons in Minneapolis with the Thunder, playing 42 games and scoring 4 goals for the team. He part of the Minnesota squad which knocked Los Angeles Galaxy out of the Lamar Hunt US Open Cup in 2005.

Tenoff moved to Cleveland City Stars of the USL Second Division in 2008, and helped them to the USL2 title in his first year.

References

External links
 Cleveland City Stars bio

1978 births
Living people
Dayton Flyers men's soccer players
South African soccer players
Indiana Blast players
Maritzburg United F.C. players
USL First Division players
Minnesota Thunder players
USL Second Division players
Cleveland City Stars players
White South African people
USL League Two players
Association football midfielders